Pamela Bell (born 21 December 1972) is a New Zealand snowboarder. She competed in the women's giant slalom event at the 1998 Winter Olympics.

References

External links
 

1972 births
Living people
New Zealand female snowboarders
Olympic snowboarders of New Zealand
Snowboarders at the 1998 Winter Olympics
Sportspeople from Wellington City